Borsbeek is a municipality located in Flanders, one of the three regions of Belgium, and in the Flemish province of Antwerp. The municipality only comprises the town of Borsbeek proper. On 1 January 2021 Borsbeek had a total population of 11,076. The total area is 3.92 km² which gives a population density of 2.825 inhabitants per km².

On 28 January 2022, the mayors of Borsbeek and Antwerp announced they intend to merge: the small, densely populated town of Borsbeek might become the 10th district of the city of Antwerp by 2025.

History 
Borsbeek was first mentioned in 1232. In 1264, it becomes an independent parish. Until the 16th century, it was part of the County of Cantecroy. In the late 16th century, during the Dutch Revolt, Borsbeek was pillaged and destroyed several times. In 1746, the village was nearly wiped out during the War of the Austrian Succession. Borsbeek used to be an agricultural community. In the mid 20th century, it became a centre of horticulture and a residential town.

Climate

Notable people
See the :Category:People from Borsbeek.

Gallery

References

External links
 
  Official website

Municipalities of Antwerp Province
Populated places in Antwerp Province